This list of botanical gardens and arboretums in U.S. Virgin Islands is intended to include all significant botanical gardens and arboretums in the U.S. Virgin Islands

See also
List of botanical gardens and arboretums in the United States

References 

 
Arboreta in the United States Virgin Islands
botanical gardens and arboretums in United States Virgin Islands
Tourist attractions in the United States Virgin Islands